Au Hasard Balthazar (meaning "Balthazar, at Random"), also known as Balthazar, is a 1966 French tragedy film directed by Robert Bresson. Believed to be inspired by a passage from Fyodor Dostoyevsky's 1868–69 novel The Idiot, the film follows a donkey as he is given to various owners, most of whom treat him callously.

Noted for Bresson's ascetic directorial style and regarded as a work of profound emotional effect, it is frequently listed as one of the greatest films of all time.

Plot
In the French countryside near the Pyrenees, a baby donkey is adopted by young children - Jacques and his sisters, who live on a farm. They baptize the donkey (and christen it Balthazar) along with Marie, Jacques' childhood sweetheart, whose father is the teacher at the small school next door. When one of Jacques' sisters dies, his family vacates the farm, and Marie's family take it over in a loose arrangement. The donkey is given away to local farmhands who work it very hard. Years pass until Balthazar is involved in an accident and runs off, finding its way back to Marie, who is now a teenager. Marie's father gets involved in legal wrangles over the farm with Jacques’s father, and the donkey is given away to a local bakery for delivery work.

Gérard, leader of a young criminal gang, is the delivery boy at the bakery. He is jealous of Balthazar because Marie loves him, and takes charge of the donkey, treating it cruelly. Marie, driving a 2CV one day, sees the donkey at the roadside and stops to greet it. Gérard, who'd been sleeping nearby, gets into her car and refuses to leave when demanded. It is implied that Gérard sexually assaults her after she gives up on attempting to flee, and afterwards she drives home. Marie enters into an abusive relationship with the violent Gérard, leaving her parents. Gérard is summoned to the local police station and questioned about a murder along with Arnold, an alcoholic who is also a suspect. Neither is arrested. Gérard and his gang assault Arnold, calling him a murderer and a stool-pigeon. Balthazar becomes ill and is nearly euthanized, but Arnold interrupts and takes the donkey off their hands.

Balthazar recovers and Arnold uses the donkey and another to guide tourists around the Pyrenees. When the season ends, Balthazar escapes and joins a circus. But when the donkey sees Arnold in the audience it goes berserk, and Arnold retrieves it. Arnold's uncle dies and he inherits a fortune. He throws a wild party at a bar, at which Marie and her mother talk and she is asked to come home, which Marie refuses. Gérard puts Arnold on Balthazar's back to ride home. However, he is so drunk he falls off, hits his head on the ground and dies. The police send Balthazar to market. An avaricious local miller buys the donkey, using (and abusing) it for pumping water and milling. One rainy night, Marie, soaking wet, knocks on the miller's door asking for shelter - she has run away from Gérard. The miller says he'll be her companion and help her to escape, as she confided in him that she wished to "run away" - but the next morning sees her parents and offers them the donkey, the implication being that Marie will follow. Marie goes back to her parents. Jacques visits, wanting to marry her, and when Marie tells him about the abuse she has suffered he does not change his mind. Jacques also says that his father does not want the money the court ordered Marie's father to pay him. Marie is conflicted and is not sure if she is angry with Jacques or if she wants to be with him. She says she wants to "have it out" with Gérard and goes to visit a barn where they used to meet. Gérard is there with his gang, and they strip her, beat her, then lock her in.

Marie's father and Jacques find her and break a window to get in. They take her home, pulled in a cart by Balthazar. Later Jacques wants to see Marie, but her mother comes downstairs and says, "She's gone and will never come back." Marie's father dies shortly after, when visited by a priest. While Marie's mother is grieving, Gérard turns up with his gang and asks if they can borrow Balthazar. Marie's mother refuses, as Balthazar is to carry the ashes of Marie's father in his funeral procession. In the dark of night Gérard abducts Balthazar to carry contraband over the Spanish border.

When Gérard and his accomplice are supposed to meet their contact, they are instead shot at by customs guards and they flee, leaving Balthazar to his fate. In the morning, we see Balthazar has a gunshot wound. A shepherd and his flock come. The sheep gather around Balthazar, their bells jangling. He lies down and dies.

Cast
 Anne Wiazemsky as Marie
 Walter Green as Jacques
 François Lafarge as Gérard
 Philippe Asselin as Marie's father
 Nathalie Joyaut as Marie's mother
 Jean-Claude Guilbert as Arnold
 Pierre Klossowski as the miller
 Jean-Joel Barbier as the priest
 François Sullerot as the baker
 Marie-Claire Fremont as the baker's wife
 Jacques Sorbets as the gendarme
 Jean Rémignard as the attorney

Production
After making several prison-themed films using his theory of "pure cinematography", Bresson stated that he wanted to move onto a different style of filmmaking. The story was inspired by Fyodor Dostoyevsky's The Idiot  and each episode in Balthazar's life represents one of the seven deadly sins. Bresson later stated that the film was "made up of many lines that intersect one another" and that Balthazar was meant to be a symbol of Christian faith. Bresson produced the film with help from the Swedish Film Institute.

According to Wiazemsky's 2007 novel Jeune Fille, she and Bresson developed a close relationship during the shooting of the film, although it was not consummated. On location they stayed in adjoining rooms and Wiazemsky said that "at first, he would content himself by holding my arm, or stroking my cheek. But then came the disagreeable moment when he would try to kiss me ... I would push him away and he wouldn't insist, but he looked so unhappy that I always felt guilty." Later Wiazemsky had sex with a member of the film's crew, which she says gave her the courage to reject Bresson as a lover. Bresson was known to cast nonprofessional actors and use their inexperience to create a specific type of realism in his films. Wiazemsky states: "It was not his intention to teach me how to be an actress. Almost against the grain, I felt the emotion the role provoked in me, and later, in other films, I learned how to use that emotion."

Ghislain Cloquet was the cinematographer for Au Hasard Balthazar; it was the first of three films Cloquet shot for Bresson. Bresson's long collaboration with Léonce-Henri Burel had ended with Bresson's previous film, The Trial of Joan of Arc. As described by Daryl Chin, Bresson and Cloquet "would evolve a cinematic style of subtle, sun-dappled radiance; without extending the photography into extremes of chiaroscuro contrast, Cloquet would heighten the lighting so that even the greys would glisten."

The film's editor was Raymond Lamy, a veteran of French cinema whose first editing credit was in 1931. From 1956 through 1971, Lamy edited all of Bresson's films excepting The Trial of Joan of Arc (1962).

Reception
When Au Hasard Balthazar first played in New York at the 1966 Film Festival, "it received mostly unfavorable notices". Reviews in Europe, however, were glowing. The noted filmmaker and Cahiers du Cinéma critic Jean-Luc Godard said, "Everyone who sees this film will be absolutely astonished [...] because this film is really the world in an hour and a half." Godard married Anne Wiazemsky, who played Marie in the film, in 1967. Film critic Tom Milne called it "perhaps [Bresson's] greatest film to date, certainly his most complex."

The theatrical release in the United States came four years later. In 1970, Roger Greenspun of The New York Times lauded the film's final scene as "surely one of the most affecting passages in the history of film." Andrew Sarris, one of cinema's most influential critics, wrote in his 1970 review: "No film I have ever seen has come so close to convulsing my entire being ... It stands by itself as one of the loftiest pinnacles of artistically realized emotional experience." The New Yorker film critic Pauline Kael, however, wrote that although some consider the work a masterpiece, "others may find it painstakingly tedious and offensively holy". Ingmar Bergman also said of the movie, "this Balthazar, I didn't understand a word of it, it was so completely boring... A donkey, to me, is completely uninteresting, but a human being is always interesting."

The film's religious imagery, spiritual allegories and naturalistic, minimalist aesthetic style have since been widely praised by film reviewers. In 2005, James Quandt referred to it as a "brief, elliptical tale about the life and death of a donkey" that has "exquisite renderings of pain and abasement" and "compendiums of cruelty" that tell a powerful spiritual message. In 2003, J. Hoberman stated, "Robert Bresson's heart-breaking and magnificent Au Hasard Balthazar (1966) – the story of a donkey's life and death in rural France – is the supreme masterpiece by one of the greatest of 20th-century filmmakers." Manohla Dargis views Au Hasard Balthazar as "one of the greatest films in history", writing that it "stirs the heart and soul as much as the mind." Roger Ebert argued, "The genius of Bresson's approach is that he never gives us a single moment that could be described as one of Balthazar's 'reaction shots.' Other movie animals may roll their eyes or stomp their hooves, but Balthazar simply walks or waits, regarding everything with the clarity of a donkey who knows it is a beast of burden, and that its life consists of either bearing or not bearing [...] This is the cinema of empathy."

Ignatiy Vishnevetsky similarly commented, "Bresson never attempts to humanize Balthazar. [...] What Balthazar experiences of human nature is both pure and limited: the embrace of a lonely young woman, the unprovoked attack of an angry young man, and the work of the farms whose owners worry over money. He is only a donkey, and therefore something much more." Ebert also credits Bresson's ascetic approach to actors for much of the work's emotional power, writing, "The actors portray lives without informing us how to feel about them; forced to decide for ourselves how to feel, forced to empathize, we often have stronger feelings than if the actors were feeling them for us."

As of December 2022, on review aggregator website Rotten Tomatoes, the film has a rare 100% "Certified Fresh" approval rating based on 44 reviews, with an average rating of 9.2/10. The critics consensus reads, "Au Hasard Balthazar uses one animal's lifelong journey to trace a soberly compelling – and ultimately heartbreaking – outline of the human experience." Metacritic, which uses a weighted average, assigned the film a "Metacritic Must-See" designation alongside a score of 98 out of 100, based on 20 critics, indicating "universal acclaim".

Awards and legacy
The film premièred at the 1966 Venice Film Festival where it won the OCIC (International Catholic Organization for Cinema) Award, the San Giorgio Prize, and the New Cinema Award.

Au Hasard Balthazar is the inspiration for 1977 Tamil-language film Agraharathil Kazhutai directed by Indian director John Abraham. The film was critically acclaimed upon its release and in 2013 and it was listed in IBN Live's 100 Greatest Indian movies of all time. In 1978, Agraharathil Kazhutai won the National Film Award for Best Feature Film in Tamil at the 25th National Film Awards.

Other films inspired by Au Hasard Balthazar include Todd Solondz's Wiener-Dog (2016) and Jerzy Skolimowski's EO (2022).

Au Hasard Balthazar was ranked sixteenth on the 2012 critics' poll of "the greatest films of all time" conducted by the film magazine Sight & Sound.  It was also 21st in the directors' poll, receiving 18 votes from filmmakers including Nuri Bilge Ceylan and Béla Tarr. It was also the first-place choice of Michael Haneke in the 2002 poll.  The German filmmaker Werner Herzog praised the film and called it "incredible". The American filmmaker Wes Anderson listed the film as one of his favorite films in the Criterion Collection library. The American filmmaker Richard Linklater listed the film in his top 10 film list from the Criterion Collection. In 2018 the film ranked 52nd on the BBC's list of the 100 greatest foreign-language films, as voted on by 209 film critics from 43 countries.

Home media
In 2008, the film was released to the Criterion Collection as a region 1 DVD with English subtitles. In 2013 a region 2 DVD was released by Artificial Eye, again with English subtitles.

References

Further reading
 Voted #5 on The Arts and Faith Top 100 Films (2010)
  A comparison with Mouchette, the film Bresson made just one year after Au Hasard Balthazar.

External links
 
 
 
 
Au hasard Balthazar an essay by James Quandt at the Criterion Collection

1966 films
1966 drama films
Existentialist films
Fictional donkeys
French drama films
French black-and-white films
Fiction about animal cruelty
Films based on The Idiot
Films about Christianity
Films directed by Robert Bresson
Films about donkeys
Seven deadly sins in popular culture
1960s French-language films
1960s French films